Mukka is a suburb of Mangalore city on the shore of the Arabian Sea along Coastal Karnataka. It is located along NH-66 very close to NITK, Surathkal towards Udupi. It is the gateway to Mangalore city from the north & an educational centre. It was a small town-village once upon a time but in the recent years (from 2010) the region is developing both educationally & commercially. Mukka has earned popularity because of Srinivas College of Engineering & Technology and Srinivas Institute of Medical Sciences and Research Centre and Hospital. 

The official language is Kannada but Tulu is the main language spoken here.

External links
 Tourism

Beaches of Karnataka
Localities in Mangalore